Oxheys railway station was a single platform station in Preston, Lancashire, England, on what was then the Lancaster and Preston Junction Railway
 The associated signal box was built in the 1920s by the London, Midland and Scottish Railway

It served Oxheys Cattle Market on Brook Street. It was located 793 yards from Preston railway station and closed in 1925.

References

Disused railway stations in Preston
Former London and North Western Railway stations
Former Lancaster and Preston Junction Railway stations
Railway stations in Great Britain opened in 1869
Railway stations in Great Britain closed in 1925
1869 establishments in England
1925 disestablishments in England